Charlotte Kendrick is an American folk musician from Pawling, New York.

Discography
 North of New York 2007
 Live at the Roger Smith 2004, with Dan Rowe
 I Get Stupid 2003, Re-released 2006

References

External links
 www.charlottekendrick.com
 www.sonicbids.com

Year of birth missing (living people)
Living people
American folk musicians
Musicians from New York (state)
People from Pawling, New York